Anthony Leonard "Tony" Pasquesi (June 13, 1933 – August 23, 2016) was an American football defensive lineman in the National Football League. After playing college football at Notre Dame, Pasquesi was drafted by the Chicago Cardinals in the 3rd round (32nd overall) of the 1955 NFL Draft. He played three seasons for the Chicago Cardinals (1955–1957). He died in 2016 at the age of 83 in Addison, Illinois where he lived.

References

1933 births
2016 deaths
Players of American football from Chicago
American football defensive linemen
Notre Dame Fighting Irish football players
Chicago Cardinals players
People from Addison, Illinois